The Central District of Shushtar County is a district (bakhsh) in Shushtar County, Khuzestan Province, Iran. At the 2006 census, its population was 161,714, in 33,999 families.  The district has one city: Shushtar. The district has four rural districts (dehestan): Miyan Ab Rural District, Miyan Ab-e Shomali Rural District, Sardarabad Rural District, and Shahid Modarres Rural District.

References 

Shushtar County
Districts of Khuzestan Province